Ali Faisal Alfayadh is an Iraqi politician, Member of the Committee of Oil and Energy Parliament & Member of the Iraqi Council of Representatives.

Bio
Alfayadh,(Born in Baghdad 1963)is an Iraqi politician Member of the Committee of Oil and Energy Parliament & Member of the Iraqi Council of Representatives.He is brother Falih Alfayyadh.

Positions 
 Member of the Iraqi Council of Representatives since 2004.
 Member of the Committee of Oil and Energy Parliament since 2014.

References

External links
 An Interview with Ali Faisal Alfayadh on Afaq TV
 An Interview with Ali Faisal Alfayadh on Al Sharqiya

Iraqi soldiers
Living people
1963 births
Politicians from Baghdad
Iraqi Shia Muslims
Members of the Council of Representatives of Iraq